Jensen Glacier is a tributary glacier, about  long, flowing north between the Supporters Range and Lhasa Nunatak into Snakeskin Glacier, in Antarctica. It was named by the Advisory Committee on Antarctic Names for Kenard H. Jensen, a United States Antarctic Research Program meteorologist at South Pole Station in 1963.

References

Glaciers of Dufek Coast